Tetrabrachiidae, or the four-armed frogfishes, is a family of anglerfishes found in relatively shallow waters of the eastern Indian Ocean and western Pacific Ocean reaching from Indonesia and New Guinea to Australia.  They prefer living in regions of the ocean floor composed of soft sediments.

References
 

Lophiiformes
Marine fish families